Carex grayi, commonly known as Gray's sedge, is a species of flowering plant in the sedge family, Cyperaceae. It is native to eastern North America.

References

grayi
Flora of North America
Plants described in 1848
Taxa named by John Carey (botanist)